The Federal University Otuoke is a federal government-owned University sited in Otuoke, a town in Ogbia local government area  of Bayelsa State, Southern Nigeria. The university is one of the nine new Federal Universities established by the Federal Government of Nigeria in February 2011 under the administration of president, Dr Goodluck Jonathan. Federal University Otuoke is sited  in the heart of the oil-rich Niger-Delta Region of Bayelsa State. The university was established in 2011 and started with 282 pioneer students. The university has six (6) faculties and offers degree courses at undergraduate levels.
The undergraduate courses are in the faculty of Science, Management Science,Social Science and Humanities, Education, Engineering and Technology. The university is a Partner of Sustainable Public Procurement. In November 2020, Prof. Teddy Charles Adias was appointed Vice Chancellor of the university

Role in the one planet network 
The university is a Partner of Sustainable Public Procurement.

Faculties and departments
source:

Expulsion of students involved in examination malpractice
On Thursday, March 28, 2019, FUOTUOKE expelled 12 students who were involved in cultism and examination malpractice.  At the time of the expulsion, five of the students were 200 level while the other seven students were in 300 level. Also, on the 6th of December 2019, twenty nine students were expelled for their alleged involvement in cultism and examination malpractices.

References

External links
School website

2011 establishments in Nigeria
Educational institutions established in 2011
Bayelsa State
Federal universities of Nigeria